Serhii Bondarchuk (Ukrainian: Сергі́й Васи́льович Бондарчу́к; born 31 October 1971) is a Ukrainian civic and political activist, officer of the Security Service of Ukraine, and Hero of Ukraine.

Awards 
Hero of Ukraine (with the award of the Order of the State, February 18, 2010 - “for outstanding personal merits to the Ukrainian state in the development of military-technical cooperation, increasing the international authority of Ukraine, many years of fruitful work”). The title was given for assistance in strengthening Georgia's defense capacity during the Russian aggression.
 Order of Vakhtang Gorgasal, I Degree (State award of Georgia. Foreign citizens who have shown courage and self-sacrifice in the struggle for independence and territorial integrity of Georgia can be awarded with this Order. November 5, 2013 - “for special services to the people and homeland, for defense and self-sacrifice”).

Links 
Official Facebook

1971 births
Living people
Politicians from Kyiv
Kiev Military College of Frunze alumni
Taras Shevchenko National University of Kyiv alumni
Recipients of the Order of State
Fourth convocation members of the Verkhovna Rada